Shannon Grant (born 19 April 1977) is a former Australian rules footballer who was a midfielder in the AFL. He began his career at the Sydney Swans in 1995 before moving to the Kangaroos in 1998 and being a part of their 1999 premiership side, in which he also won the Norm Smith Medal for best on ground. In 1996, he actually played against North Melbourne in the Grand Final, playing on the losing side of Sydney.

In the 2005 season, Grant was involved in numerous comeback victories by the Kangaroos. The first was in Round 2 against the Sydney Swans, at Manuka Oval. Trailing by 17 points at 3 quarter time, Grant and his team mates lifted with Grant kicking three goals to help the Roos to a convincing win. The following week against , the Roos again lifted from a 3rd quarter shocker, trailing against the highly fancied St Kilda which had not lost a game at Docklands Stadium since 2003. Grant once again kicked four goals in the last quarter to defeat the Saints by seven points (100 to 93). In Round 19, the Kangaroos trailed by three goals with four minutes to play against  at Telstra Dome.

Grant announced his retirement on 26 August 2008. The following Saturday, he played the 300th game of his career. His 301st and last game of AFL football was an elimination final against his former club, the Sydney Swans, at ANZ Stadium in Sydney, which the Kangaroos lost by 35 points. Grant was given a standing ovation by both Sydney and North Melbourne players as he left the ground for the final time.

Grant coached the Frankston Football Club for one season in the Victorian Football League (VFL) in 2009.

At season end of 2009, he was appointed coach of the struggling Bendigo Bombers for 2010, also in the VFL.

Grant joined the Western Bulldogs' coaching panel as an assistant coach for 2012 after two seasons at Essendon.

In 2015, Grant coached the senior team at Greenvale Football Club in the Essendon District Football League. The team played off in the grand final, losing to Aberfeldie Football Club. 

In June 2018, Grant was sentenced to six months in prison for assaulting his former partner. The sentence was overturned on appeal, and he was ordered to complete 200 hour of community service.

Playing statistics

|- style="background-color: #EAEAEA"
! scope="row" style="text-align:center" | 1995
|style="text-align:center;"|
| 9 || 10 || 9 || 10 || 80 || 47 || 127 || 38 || 11 || 0.9 || 1.0 || 8.0 || 4.7 || 12.7 || 3.8 || 1.1
|-
! scope="row" style="text-align:center" | 1996
|style="text-align:center;"|
| 9 || 25 || 11 || 8 || 276 || 154 || 430 || 104 || 43 || 0.4 || 0.3 || 11.0 || 6.2 || 17.2 || 4.2 || 1.7
|- style="background:#eaeaea;"
! scope="row" style="text-align:center" | 1997
|style="text-align:center;"|
| 9 || 23 || 18 || 13 || 233 || 108 || 341 || 64 || 27 || 0.8 || 0.6 || 10.1 || 4.7 || 14.8 || 2.8 || 1.2
|-
! scope="row" style="text-align:center" | 1998
|style="text-align:center;"|
| 6 || 25 || 46 || 16 || 261 || 137 || 398 || 70 || 35 || 1.8 || 0.6 || 10.4 || 5.5 || 15.9 || 2.8 || 1.4
|- style="background:#eaeaea;"
| scope=row bgcolor=F0E68C | 1999# || 
| 6 || 24 || 37 || 11 || 310 || 181 || 491 || 110 || 27 || 1.5 || 0.5 || 12.9 || 7.5 || 20.5 || 4.6 || 1.1
|-
! scope="row" style="text-align:center" | 2000
|style="text-align:center;"|
| 6 || 25 || 29 || 18 || 304 || 131 || 435 || 127 || 28 || 1.2 || 0.7 || 12.2 || 5.2 || 17.4 || 5.1 || 1.1
|- style="background:#eaeaea;"
! scope="row" style="text-align:center" | 2001
|style="text-align:center;"|
| 6 || 20 || 26 || 21 || 315 || 164 || 479 || 101 || 46 || 1.3 || 1.1 || 15.8 || 8.2 || 24.0 || 5.1 || 2.3
|-
! scope="row" style="text-align:center" | 2002
|style="text-align:center;"|
| 6 || 20 || 12 || 17 || 227 || 125 || 352 || 76 || 33 || 0.6 || 0.9 || 11.4 || 6.3 || 17.6 || 3.8 || 1.7
|- style="background:#eaeaea;"
! scope="row" style="text-align:center" | 2003
|style="text-align:center;"|
| 6 || 20 || 22 || 23 || 287 || 159 || 446 || 108 || 41 || 1.1 || 1.2 || 14.4 || 8.0 || 22.3 || 5.4 || 2.1
|-
! scope="row" style="text-align:center" | 2004
|style="text-align:center;"|
| 6 || 22 || 23 || 18 || 273 || 194 || 467 || 89 || 55 || 1.0 || 0.8 || 12.4 || 8.8 || 21.2 || 4.0 || 2.5
|- style="background:#eaeaea;"
! scope="row" style="text-align:center" | 2005
|style="text-align:center;"|
| 6 || 23 || 39 || 24 || 296 || 135 || 431 || 122 || 29 || 1.7 || 1.0 || 12.9 || 5.9 || 18.7 || 5.3 || 1.3
|-
! scope="row" style="text-align:center" | 2006
|style="text-align:center;"|
| 6 || 18 || 21 || 18 || 247 || 109 || 356 || 127 || 31 || 1.2 || 1.0 || 13.7 || 6.1 || 19.8 || 7.1 || 1.7
|- style="background:#eaeaea;"
! scope="row" style="text-align:center" | 2007
|style="text-align:center;"|
| 6 || 25 || 39 || 21 || 281 || 137 || 418 || 135 || 40 || 1.6 || 0.8 || 11.2 || 5.5 || 16.7 || 5.4 || 1.6
|-
! scope="row" style="text-align:center" | 2008
|style="text-align:center;"|
| 6 || 21 || 29 || 17 || 209 || 129 || 338 || 111 || 41 || 1.4 || 0.8 || 10.0 || 6.1 || 16.1 || 5.3 || 2.0
|- class="sortbottom"
! colspan=3| Career
! 301
! 361
! 235
! 3599
! 1910
! 5509
! 1382
! 487
! 1.2
! 0.8
! 12.0
! 6.3
! 18.3
! 4.6
! 1.6
|}

Honours and achievements
Team
 AFL premiership player (/): 1999
 McClelland Trophy: 1996
 McClelland Trophy: 1998

Individual
 Norm Smith Medal: 1999
 Syd Barker Medal: 2001
 All-Australian team: 2005
 Australian international rules football team: 2005
 AFL Rising Star nominee: 1996 (Round 6)

References

External links
 

1977 births
Living people
Australian rules footballers from Victoria (Australia)
North Melbourne Football Club players
North Melbourne Football Club Premiership players
Sydney Swans players
Norm Smith Medal winners
All-Australians (AFL)
Syd Barker Medal winners
Western Jets players
Australia international rules football team players
Australian people convicted of assault
One-time VFL/AFL Premiership players